Ussuriana is an east Palearctic genus of butterfly in the family Lycaenidae.

Species
 Ussuriana choui Wang & Fan, 2000
 Ussuriana fani Koiwaya, 1993 – China
 Ussuriana fani zihaoi Huang, 2016 – China
 Ussuriana igarashii Wang & Owada, 2009 – China
 Ussuriana michaelis (Oberthür, 1880)
 Ussuriana plania Wang & Ren, 1999 – China
 Ussuriana stygiana (Butler, 1881) – Japan.
 Ussuriana takarana (Araki & Hirayama, 1941) – Taiwan

References

External links
Funet

Theclini
Butterfly genera
Taxa named by J. W. Tutt